Maizeret is a village of Wallonia and a district of the municipality of Andenne, located in the province of Namur, Belgium.

It was a municipality before the fusion of the Belgian municipalities in 1977.
 Places : Bialy, Biche, Core, Gawday, Haie Marie, Moisnil, Sur le Try, Tasseneur, Trieuchamps, Vil-en-Val

Monuments 
 The Saint-Martin church from 1926.
 The Écritures de Maizeret

Château 
 The Château du Moisnil, renovated in 1902 by Octave Flanneau (1860–1937) for Jules van Dievoet, lawyer at the Belgian Supreme Court and currently owned by the Ursel family.

See also 
 Andenne
 Chateau du Moisnil

References

External links 
 Official website of the village of Maizeret
 Andenne Online : Diverses infos à propos de la commune d'Andenne
 Website of the commune of Andenne
 Le château du Moisnil à Maizeret, par l'architecte Octave Flanneau
 Cartes Postales Anciennes d'Andenne – Landenne
 Galerie du photographe Olivier Maizeret

Former municipalities of Namur (province)
Sub-municipalities of Andenne